Whitewashing in beauty is a phenomenon in the intersection of the fashion industry, digital photography, mass media, marketing and advertising. It describes a situation in which the skin tone of non-white people – when depicted in magazine covers, advertisements, commercials, music videos, etc. – is digitally retouched or physically modified to appear whiter. Whitewashing can also present itself in the alteration of hair texture to resemble Eurocentric beauty ideals of straight hair. Whitewashing can be seen in the form of skin whitening, either digitally or with harmful skin bleaching products, or by chemically relaxing textured hair to make it conform to Eurocentric beauty standards. Additionally, plastic surgery can be used to alter features to make them appear more European, such as double eyelid surgery.

Whitewashing has been seen for years in the media, through film, photography, advertising, etc. Whitewashing in Hollywood is a prevalent issue, often attributed to the lack of racial diversity in the industry itself. Advertising companies often will airbrush their models to make them appear to have lighter skin, as seen in the L'Oréal campaign with Beyoncé in 2008.

Whitewashing can also be seen when a film or television series based on a book or other precedent decides to rewrite a non-white role as white and use a white actor to portray the role. This is not to be confused with blackface, which is when a person who is not Black attempts to portray a darker skin tone with makeup or digital editing. This type of whitewashing is most common in the film industry and has been an issue since the beginning of Hollywood. More people of color are being represented in the industry as of late, but whitewashing remains a prevalent issue that can affect self-image of young children whose races have been marginalized in film.

Cultural whitewashing is also common in the media, in which a culture's traditions are tweaked to satisfy Western stereotypes, such as in the popular film Step Up.

Global examples

Japan 
A Japanese term called "bihaku" refers to skin whitening products. A 1997 study valued the face-whitening market at approximately ¥160 billion yen.

Popular examples

Advertising 
A clear example of beauty whitewashing is a L'Oreal advertisement which used Beyoncé Knowles, it was printed in Elle magazine and Essence magazine. Beyoncé Knowles' skin was digitally retouched to appear lighter in Elle magazine compare to the Essence magazine targeted at African American women. This brought the corporation under fire for a significant period. Other examples include celebrities such as Halle Berry, Brandy, Mariah Carey, Rihanna, Freida Pinto, Jennifer Lopez, Tyra Banks, Leona Lewis, Jennifer Hudson, Gabourey Sidibe and Queen Latifah, in which these figures were subjected to skin lightening during the editing stage of promotional photoshoots. In 2014, Vanity Fair was accused of lightening Lupita Nyong’o in the “Vanities” section when red carpet photos differed widely than the ones in the magazine.

The photo and video-sharing app, Snapchat, also attracted public criticism in 2016 for potential whitewashing in its photo filters. A particular target of this outcry was the use of words such as "beautify" and "pretty" associated with the skin-lightening filters.

Film 
In 2017, Rupert Sanders’ Hollywood rendition of the 1995 Japanese manga Ghost In the Shell came under scrutiny for casting a white actress (Scarlett Johansson,) to play the Japanese protagonist. Though this wasn't physical whitewashing through skin whitening or hair relaxant, it is still considered whitewashing since a white actress was used instead of a Japanese one and the role was rewritten for a white actress.

In the 2014 film Aloha, directed by Cameron Crowe, Emma Stone (a white actress) was cast for the role of Captain Allison Ng, a woman who was partially Hawaiian. Similar to Ghost In the Shell, a white actress was used in place of a person of color, effectively whitewashing the role and the film itself.

In Harry Potter. Lavender Brown is one of the minor characters was originally played by a black actress. She was replaced by a white actress later on.

Whitewashing (beauty) in films is commonly identified when a non white role is cast by a white person. An example that dates back to 2007 but still endures heavy criticism in 2022 is the biopic film A Mighty Heart which was directed by Michael Winterbottom. In this film, Angelina Jolie who is white played Mariane Pearl who is of French black descent. Speculations on why a black actor wasn’t cast to portray the real life Mariane Pearl began to occur. A white actress portraying a black woman in a biopic film is whitewashing the beauty standards of the real life Mariane Pearl.

Furthermore, dating back to the 1970s Greek films have promoted the idea of whitewashing. In some Greek films, those of African descent are put beneath their white counterparts as they’re seen as less of beauty, intelligence, and European culture. In these films a mockery is made out of those of African descent, only for the Greek film industry to call It “just a joke” that holds no merit.

Public figures 
Typically, women primarily use products to lighten their skin, but in many cases men also do. Former professional baseball star, Sammy Sosa admitted to using skin bleaching cream in an interview with Primer Impacto of the Univision Spanish network, saying: "It's a bleaching cream that I apply before going to bed and whitens my skin some.… It's a cream that I have, that I use to soften [my skin], but has bleached me some. I'm not racist, I live my life happily."

Political figures 
Political figures have also been known to engage in whitewashing beauty standards. Former governor of Louisiana Bobby Jindal’s, 2008 portrait featured a whitewashed Bobby Jindal. Bobby Jindal is Indian yet appears white in the portrait. Many speculated as to why Bobby Jindal’s portrait was painted to appeal to European beauty standards and in this case European beauty standards in politics. Bobby Jindal’s official political portrait even sparked controversy on popular social media platforms in 2015 accusing the portrait as not even looking like the real Bobby Jindal whowho has a much more brown skin tone. Bobby Jindal even accentuates on a surface level to white beauty standards as he uses a different name under his political  reign. His real first name is Piyush but goes by a more whitewashed first name which is Bobby.

Critique 
The reasons for altering skin tone in advertisements are believed to be primarily marketing purposes, more specifically directly appealing to whiter ethnicities, which are generally the strongest target groups in consumer-driven areas such as Europe and America. Skin tone manipulation can also reflect the implicit beauty standards or ideals that the marketers perpetuate. Beauty whitewash is criticized for distorting general perceptions of reality, exuding a twisted sense of beauty, and having a negative influence on women, children, and communities alike.

These Eurocentric ideals are forced upon people of color, creating hierarchies within their own communities. Ultimately, whitewashing creates social tension not only between White and non-White communities, but also between groups who resemble the more established beauty standards, such as lighter-skinned African Americans, and the groups who do not, including darker-skinned African Americans. This phenomenon can apply to both men and women of color.

Kai Nelson believes that whitewashing has a negative impact on children in African American communities as well. The media does not always give an accurate view of the races that they are depicting, resulting in a diminishment of self-confidence in African American children. Nelson states that children interpret the altering of skin color in the beauty industry in a negative way, and can develop a viewpoint that they are "unattractive" and "undesirable". Because of the lack of Black role models in popular media, this causes them to see the Caucasian community as the "default race".

As Ronald Hall describes in his Journal of Black Studies, whitewashing has caused people of color to develop a "bleaching syndrome" which causes an internalization of preference for the dominant, or White, culture's ideals. This results in people of color developing a contempt for dark skin because it is regarded as an obstacle for assimilation. However, despite adopting white cultural values, people of color are still barred from full assimilation.

See also
 Discrimination based on skin color
 Whitewashing in film

References

External links 
 Adam Elliott-Cooper, "The Whitewash of Black Beauty", Ceasefire, The Anti-Imperialist, 11 June 2011
 Admin, Bodymatters, et al. “Whitewashing Beauty Standards.” BodyMatters Australasia, 25 Nov. 2016, https://bodymatters.com.au/whitewashing-beauty-standards/. 
Claire Gillespie June 1, 2021. “Whitewashing Means Casting White People in TV and Movie Roles That Should Be BIPOC, and That's a Problem-Here's Why.” Health.com, https://www.health.com/mind-body/health-diversity-inclusion/whitewashing. 
Cosmetic Surgery. “Asian Double Eyelid.” Cosmetic Surgery, Stanford Medicine, https://med.stanford.edu/cosmeticsurgery/aestheticservices/face/asian-double-eyelid.html. 
Lindsay Kite, "Beauty Whitewashed: How White Ideals Exclude Women Of Color", beautyredefined.net, 28 February 2011 
“White Washing Beauty Epidemic: Her Campus.” Her Campus | HerCampus.com Is the #1 Global Community for College Women, Written Entirely by the Nation's Top College Journalists from 380+ Campus Chapters around the World., 29 Sept. 2020, https://www.hercampus.com/school/pace/whitewashing-beauty-epidemic/. 
"‘Whitewashing’ in Mass Media: Exploring Colorism and the Damaging Effects of Beauty Hierarchies." Race and Technology, 10 December 2014

Beauty
Discrimination based on skin color
White privilege
Mass media
Digital photography
Marketing techniques